The Tennessee College of Applied Technology at Chattanooga is one of 47 institutions in the Tennessee Board of Regents System, the seventh largest system of higher education in the nation. This system comprises six universities, thirteen community colleges, and 28 Colleges of Applied Technology. More than 80 percent of all Tennessee students attending public institutions are enrolled in a Tennessee Board of Regents institution.

History
The Tennessee College of Applied Technology - Chattanooga (TCAT) is the only TCAT that forms an integral part of the organization of a community college, forming a unit of Chattanooga State Community College, a Tennessee Board of Regents institution serving more than 2,300 students annually. The school was founded in 1969 as the Chattanooga Area Vocational Technical School. On July 1, 1981 the AVTS became a part of Chattanooga State. In 1996 the Tennessee Board of Regents renamed the AVTS to the Tennessee Technology Center at Chattanooga.  In 2013 TTC Chattanooga was named the Tennessee College of Applied Technology - Chattanooga.

The Tennessee Technology Center at Chattanooga became the Tennessee College of Applied Technology - Chattanooga on July 1, 2013 under Senate Bill No. 643 House Bill No. 236*. Approval of Public Chapter No. 473.

The TCAT-Chattanooga offers 21 one-year diploma programs and 7 certificate programs with a total of 42 faculty and staff, making it one of the larger divisions on the campus of Chattanooga State. The faculty members are dedicated full-time to teaching and advising students, being well prepared to teach, with many having work experience in business and industry.

Office the Tennessee Colleges of Applied Technology
The headquarters of the Tennessee Colleges of Applied Technology is in Nashville. James King is the Vice Chancellor for the Colleges of Applied Technology.

Academic programs
Each of the Tennessee Colleges of Applied Technology offers programs based on geographic needs of businesses and industry.  Therefore each college can have different academic programs and offerings.  The following academic programs are available at TCAT Chattanooga.

Aesthetics
Air Conditioning/Refrigeration 
Automotive Mechatronics 
Automotive Technology 
Building Construction Tech 
Business Systems Technology 
Collision Repair 
Commercial Truck Driving
Computer Operations Technology 
Cosmetology
Diesel Equipment Mechanics 
Industrial Electricity 
Industrial Electronics 
Industrial Maintenance Mechanics 
Landscape and Turf Management 
Machine Tool Technology 
Manicurist
Masonry 
Massage Therapy 
Medical Assistant 
Motorcycle & Marine Service Technology 
Practical Nursing 
Security
Surgical Technology 
Plumbing 
Welding

Student organizations
The Tennessee College of Applied Technology at Chattanooga State provides memberships and organizations for students, including the following: 
National Technical Honor Society
SkillsUSA
Student Government Association

Professional memberships
American Welding Society
CompTIA
Microsoft

Accreditation
The Tennessee College of Applied Technology - Chattanooga is accredited by the Council of Occupational Education (COE), a regional accrediting agency of the Southern Association of Colleges and Schools (SACS).

See also
 List of colleges and universities in Tennessee

References

Education in Tennessee
Education in Chattanooga, Tennessee
Public universities and colleges in Tennessee